The 2001 WNBA season was their third in the league. The Miracle missed the playoffs for the second time in franchise history. The Miracle also hosted the 2001 WNBA All-Star Game.

Offseason

WNBA Draft

Transactions
May 27: The Miracle waived Denique Graves, Romana Hamzova, Shelley Sandie and Anne Thorius.
May 22: The Miracle waived Andrea Congreaves.
May 21: The Miracle waived Jannon Roland.
May 11: The Miracle waived Shaka Massey, LaCharlotte Smith and Tora Suber.
May 4: The Miracle waived Shawnetta Stewart and Tauja Catchings.
May 3: The Miracle signed Tora Suber and LaCharlotte Smith and waived Nakia Sanford.
May 1: The Miracle waived Tauja Catchings.
April 30: The Miracle signed Tawona Alhaleem, Tauja Catchings, Denique Graves, Shaka Massey, Nyree Roberts, Shelley Sandie, Nakia Sanford and Shawnetta Stewart.

Roster

Season standings

Season schedule

Depth

Player stats
http://www.wnba.com/sun/stats/2001/

Awards and honors
Taj McWilliams-Franklin and Nykesha Sales were named to the WNBA All-Star team.
Adrienne Johnson received the Hometown Hero Award.

References

Orlando Miracle seasons
Orlando
Orlando Miracle